Mariano Aquino (born 6 July 1969) is a judoka from Guam. He competed in the men's half-middleweight event at the 1988 Summer Olympics.

References

External links

1969 births
Living people
Guamanian male judoka
Olympic judoka of Guam
Judoka at the 1988 Summer Olympics
Place of birth missing (living people)